Ferrocarril Urquiza may refer to:

 The General Urquiza Railway, an Argentine standard gauge railway and former state railway company.
 UAI Urquiza, an Argentine Primera B Metropolitana football team in Greater Buenos Aires.

See also 

 Rail transport in Argentina
 Football in Argentina